The Pickens County School District is a public school district in Pickens County, Georgia, United States, based in Jasper. It serves the communities of Jasper, Nelson, Talking Rock, and Tate.

Schools
The Pickens County School District has three elementary schools, one middle school, one junior high school, and one high school.

Elementary schools
Harmony Elementary School
Hill City Elementary School
Tate Elementary School

Middle schools
Jasper Middle School
Pickens Junior High School

High school
Pickens High School

References

External links

School districts in Georgia (U.S. state)
Education in Pickens County, Georgia